The 2013 NRA 500 was a NASCAR Sprint Cup Series stock car race held on April 13, 2013, at Texas Motor Speedway in Fort Worth, Texas, United States. Contested over 334 laps on the 1.5–mile (2.4 km) quad-oval, it was the seventh race of the 2013 Sprint Cup Series championship. Kyle Busch of Joe Gibbs Racing won the race, his second win of the 2013 season and first at Texas, while Martin Truex Jr. finished second. Carl Edwards, Greg Biffle, and Joey Logano rounded out the top five.

By also winning the Friday night Nationwide Series race, Busch completed his second weekend sweep of 2013, having also accomplished this at Fontana. A Texas man committed suicide by putting a gun to his head and shooting himself after an argument with another fan near an infield.

Report

Background
The track's turns are banked at twenty-four degrees, while the front stretch, the location of the finish line, is five degrees. The back stretch, opposite of the front, also has a five degree banking. The racetrack has a permanent capacity of 138,122 spectators, and an infield capacity of  53,000. Greg Biffle is the defending race winner after winning the event in 2012.

Before the race, Jimmie Johnson was leading the Drivers' Championship with 231 points,  while Brad Keselowski stood in second with 225 points. Dale Earnhardt Jr. followed in the third position, 17 points ahead of Kyle Busch and 20 ahead of Kasey Kahne in fourth and fifth. Biffle, with 199, was seven points ahead of Carl Edwards and 20 ahead of Clint Bowyer, as Paul Menard was seven points ahead of Matt Kenseth and twelve ahead of Joey Logano in tenth and eleventh. Jeff Gordon completed the first twelve positions with 164 points.

Sponsorship controversy
The race's sponsorship by National Rifle Association (NRA) proved to be controversial prior to the race. Although race sponsorships are negotiated with the track owner, not NASCAR itself, the sanctioning organization has final approval and did not object to the sponsorship. Both NASCAR's acceptance of this sponsorship, and its timing, has been controversial, and offensive to gun control activists. Because of the sponsorship, Senator Chris Murphy asked Rupert Murdoch, whose News Corporation owns Fox Sports, which was scheduled to air the race, to not broadcast it. Fox broadcast the race as scheduled, not least because failure to do so would have been a breach of the network's contract with NASCAR. However, Fox only used the official sponsored name once per hour (the minimum mandated by NASCAR) and otherwise referred to it generically (in this case as the "Texas 500"), the network's usual practice when a race's title sponsor does not buy ads during the race broadcast; the NRA reportedly did not seek to purchase any such ads. Duck Commander replaced NRA as the sponsor for the following year's race, while NRA would return as a race sponsor in 2016 for the Bristol Night Race in August at Speedway's owned Bristol Motor Speedway.

Practice and qualifying

Two practice sessions were held in preparation for the race; both on Friday, April 12, 2013. The first session and second session lasted for 90 minutes each.  During the first practice session, Martin Truex Jr., for the Michael Waltrip Racing team, was quickest ahead of Earnhardt Jr. in second and Johnson in third. Jamie McMurray was scored fourth, and Kevin Harvick managed fifth. Edwards, Jeff Burton, Kenseth, Biffle, and Casey Mears rounded out the top ten quickest drivers in the session.

Marcos Ambrose was quickest in the second and final practice session, ahead of Kyle Busch in second, and Aric Almirola in third. Kurt Busch was fourth quickest, and Truex Jr. took fifth. Juan Pablo Montoya, Burton, Biffle, Paul Menard, and Keselowski followed in the top ten.

During qualifying, forty-five cars were entered, meaning only two cars were not able to start because of NASCAR's qualifying procedure. Kyle Busch clinched his second pole position of the season, with a record-setting time of 27.509 seconds. After his qualifying run, Busch commented, "Not too shabby of a day. ... I feel like we have a good piece for the race. It felt that good. Sometimes you feel that good and it's not very fast."  He was joined on the front row of the grid by his brother, Kurt Busch. Almirola qualified third, Ambrose took fourth, and Truex Jr. started fifth. Earnhardt, Johnson, Jeff Gordon, Edwards, and Montoya completed the first ten positions on the grid. The two drivers who failed to qualify for the race were Scott Speed and Scott Riggs.

Post-race penalties
Three teams were issued penalties after the race. The No. 56 Michael Waltrip Racing car of Martin Truex Jr. was fined six driver points and Michael Waltrip was penalized six owner points for the front car height failing to meet NASCAR specifications. Crew chief Chad Johnston was fined $25,000 and placed on probation until June 5. MWR did not appeal the penalty. The No. 2 and No. 22 Penske Racing cars were considered more controversial. The teams were fined for unapproved suspension parts. Penske Racing appealed the decision, but the only reduction involved the suspension from seven races to three (two plus the Sprint All-Star Race).

The penalties for the No. 2 car:
 Driver Brad Keselowski fined 25 driver points and team owner Roger Penske fined 25 owner points.
 Crew Chief Paul Wolfe fined $100,000, suspended two points races and the Sprint All-Star Race, on probation until December 31
 Car chief Jerry Kelly, team engineer Brian Wilson, and Penske Racing competition director Travis Geisler suspended three races and placed on probation until December 31.

The penalties for the No. 22 car:
 Driver Joey Logano fined 25 driver points and team owner Walt Czarnecki fined 25 owner points.
 Crew Chief Todd Gordon fined $100,000, suspended two points races and the Sprint All-Star Race, on probation until December 31
 Car chief Raymond Fox and team engineer Samuel Stanley suspended three races and placed on probation until December 31.

Results

Qualifying

Race results

Standings after the race

Drivers' Championship standings

Manufacturers' Championship standings

Note: Only the first twelve positions are included for the driver standings.

References

NRA 500
NRA 500
NRA 500
2010s in Fort Worth, Texas
NASCAR races at Texas Motor Speedway
NASCAR controversies